Saco (Spanish for "Sack") is an unincorporated community in Kern County, California.

History
The Jewetta post office operated from 1893 to 1903, with a closure during 1896 to 1898. The name Jewetta honors Solomon and Philo D. Jewett, pioneers.

References

Unincorporated communities in Kern County, California
Unincorporated communities in California